Dietzia maris is a Gram-positive and aerobic bacterium from the genus Dietzia.

References

Further reading

External links
 Dietzia cinnamea at MicrobeWiki
 Type strain of Dietzia cinnamea at BacDive -  the Bacterial Diversity Metadatabase

Mycobacteriales
Bacteria described in 2006